Niccolò Ruggeri (died 1449) was a Roman Catholic prelate who served as Bishop of Bagnoregio (1446–1449).

Biography
Niccolò Ruggeri was appointed a priest in the Order of Friars Minor. On 27 May 1446, he was appointed by Pope Eugene IV as Bishop of Bagnoregio. He served as Bishop of Bagnoregio until his death in 1449. While bishop, he was the principal consecrator of André da Mule, Archbishop of Bar (1448), and the principal co-consecrator of Fernando Lujan (bishop), Bishop of Sigüenza (1449).

References

External links and additional sources
 (for Chronology of Bishops) 
 (for Chronology of Bishops) 

15th-century Italian Roman Catholic bishops
1449 deaths
Bishops appointed by Pope Eugene IV
Franciscan bishops